Govindpura Assembly constituency is one of the 230 assembly constituencies of Madhya Pradesh. It comes under Bhopal district.

In Govindpura Vidhan Sabha all major parties including  BJP and Congress will fight election face to face. The other parties that is BSP, Samajwadi Party and Aam Aadmi Party are also in the race. There are also some local political parties in the Govindpura election 2018. Vidhan Sabha Govindpura is the most difficult and important seat for the political parties to win. The main competition is in Vidhan Sabha Govindpura seat as the headquarters of Bhopal Seat.

Members of Legislative Assembly

Election results

References
 http://eci.nic.in/archive/se98/pollupd/ac/states/S12/Aconst238.htm
 http://wap.business-standard.com/article/pti-stories/babulal-gaur-wins-from-govindpura-for-the-tenth-time-in-a-row-113120800794_1.html
 https://mpelectionresult.com/govindpura-vidhan-sabha-chunav-2018/ 

Assembly constituencies of Madhya Pradesh